Helicarion cuvieri is a species of air-breathing land snail or semi-slug, terrestrial pulmonate gastropod molluscs in the family Helicarionidae.

Distribution
This species is endemic to south-eastern Australia.

References

External links
 Pfeiffer, L. (1850). Descriptions of twelve new species of Vitrina and Succinea from the collection of H. Cuming, Esq. Proceedings of the Zoological Society of London. 17 (198)
 Quoy J.R.C. & Gaimard J.P. (1832-1835). Voyage de découvertes de l'"Astrolabe" exécuté par ordre du Roi, pendant les années 1826-1829, sous le commandement de M. J. Dumont d'Urville. Zoologie. 1: i-l, 1-264; 2(1): 1-321 [1832; 2(2): 321-686 [1833]; 3(1): 1-366 [1834]; 3(2): 367-954 [1835]; Atlas (Mollusques): pls 1-93 [1833]. Paris: Tastu]
 Hyman, I. T.; Köhler, F. (2018). Reconciling comparative anatomy and mitochondrial phylogenetics in revising species limits in the Australian semislug Helicarion Férussac, 1821 (Gastropoda: Stylommatophora). Zoological Journal of the Linnean Society

Helicarionidae
Gastropods described in 1941
Gastropods of Australia